The Canton of Graçay is a former canton situated in the Cher département and in the Centre region of France. It was disbanded following the French canton reorganisation which came into effect in March 2015. It consisted of 6 communes, which joined the canton of Vierzon-2 in 2015. It had 3,570 inhabitants (2012).

Geography 
A farming area in the valley of the river Fouzon, in the southwestern part of the arrondissement of Vierzon, centred on the town of Graçay. The altitude varied from 91m at Saint-Georges-sur-la-Prée to 176m at Genouilly, with an average altitude of 135m.

The canton comprised 6 communes:
Dampierre-en-Graçay
Genouilly
Graçay
Nohant-en-Graçay
Saint-Georges-sur-la-Prée
Saint-Outrille

Population

See also 
 Arrondissements of the Cher department
 Cantons of the Cher department
 Communes of the Cher department

References

Gracay
2015 disestablishments in France
States and territories disestablished in 2015